Gubio, also Gobiyo, is a Local Government Area of Borno State, in northeastern Nigeria. Its headquarters are in the town of Gubio.

It has an area of 2,464 km and a population of 152,778 at the 2006 census.

The postal code of the area is 602.

The primary road through Gubio runs north towards Damasak and south towards Maiduguri. Gubio is about 60 miles from each of those two settlements.

It is one of the sixteen LGAs that constitute the Borno Emirate, a traditional state located in Borno State, Nigeria.

Massacre
On 9 June 2020, a group of gunmen killed 81 people in a massacre. The killers are believed to be from the jihadist group Boko Haram, whose insurgency began in 2009.

References

Local Government Areas in Borno State
Populated places in Borno State